German submarine U-153 was a Type IXC U-boat of Nazi Germany's Kriegsmarine built for service during World War II. The keel for this boat was laid down on 12 September 1940 at the DeSchiMAG AG Weser yard in Bremen, Germany as yard number 995. She was launched on 5 April 1941 and commissioned on 19 July under the command of Korvettenkapitän Wilfried Reichmann.

The submarine began her service life with training as part of the 4th U-boat Flotilla; moving on to the 2nd flotilla for operations. She conducted two patrols, sinking three ships.

She was sunk by an American destroyer in July 1942.

Design
German Type IXC submarines were slightly larger than the original Type IXBs. U-153 had a displacement of  when at the surface and  while submerged. She had two shafts and two  propellers.

U-153 was fitted with six  torpedo tubes (four fitted at the bow and two at the stern), 22 torpedoes, one  SK C/32 naval gun, 180 rounds, and a  SK C/30 as well as a  C/30 anti-aircraft gun. The boat had a complement of forty-eight.

Service history

On 15 November 1941, U-153 collided with the German Type VIIC submarine  in the Baltic Sea off Danzig. U-153 remained afloat, but U-583 sank with the loss of 45 crew members.

First patrol
U-153′s first patrol began with her departure from Kiel on 18 May 1942. After a brief stop in Kristiansand in Norway, she headed for the Atlantic Ocean via the gap between the Faroe and Shetland Islands. After a long southwest, south and southeast sweep, she docked at Lorient in occupied France, on the 30th.

Second patrol and loss
The survivors were helped to lifeboats and received water and cigarettes.

U-153 was attacked by US A-20A Havoc aircraft of the United States Army Air Forces 59th Bombardment Squadron (Light) on 6 July 1942 in the eastern Caribbean. She was sunk on 13 July 1942 near Colón, Panama, not far from the entrance to the Panama Canal, by the United States Navy destroyer .

Summary of raiding history

References

Bibliography

External links

German Type IX submarines
U-boats commissioned in 1941
U-boats sunk in 1942
World War II submarines of Germany
World War II shipwrecks in the Caribbean Sea
1941 ships
Ships built in Bremen (state)
U-boats sunk by depth charges
U-boats sunk by US warships
Ships lost with all hands
U-boat accidents
Maritime incidents in November 1941
Maritime incidents in July 1942